Canoeing events at the 1987 Southeast Asian Games was held between 11 September to 17 September at Jatiluhur sport centre.

Medal summary

Men's

Women's

Medal table

References
 http://eresources.nlb.gov.sg/newspapers/Digitised/Article/straitstimes19870912-1.2.44.15.15
 http://eresources.nlb.gov.sg/newspapers/Digitised/Article/straitstimes19870913-1.2.43.4
 http://eresources.nlb.gov.sg/newspapers/Digitised/Article/straitstimes19870915-1.2.50.28
 https://eresources.nlb.gov.sg/newspapers/Digitised/Article/straitstimes19870916-1.2.46.13.12
https://news.google.com/newspapers?nid=x8G803Bi31IC&dat=19870916&printsec=frontpage&hl=en
 http://eresources.nlb.gov.sg/newspapers/Digitised/Article/straitstimes19870918-1.2.48.21.7

1987 Southeast Asian Games